The 2022–23 SailGP Championship is the third season of the SailGP championship.

Entries

Team changes 
Canada and Switzerland joined the championship, increasing the number of teams to nine.

Japan SailGP Team participation has been indefinitely paused during the 2022–23 season due to a shortage of F50 yachts. Since new entrants Canada and Switzerland are self-funded, Japan was selected from the centrally-funded teams to give up their yacht due to a lack of sponsorship for the team. Japan's former helm and CEO Nathan Outteridge has since signed onto the Swiss SailGP Team and served as skipper in recent regattas.

Calendar 
Four new venues joined the schedule with the additions of Chicago, Dubai, Singapore and New Zealand. Italy will not continue as a venue for this season. Denmark's location moved from Aarhus to Copenhagen. Sydney was not on the original schedule, but later entered into a three-year contract to start with the third season.

Season

Round 1: Bermuda

Round 2: Chicago

Round 3: Great Britain

Round 4: Denmark 
Great Britain did not participate in the regatta after hitting a rock during a practice session and causing severe damage to their F50.

Round 5: Saint-Tropez 
The Range Rover France Sail Grand Prix event brought two days with wildly different wind conditions.  Day 1 featured heavy wind and fast racing with puffs reaching up to 45 km/h.  The F50 class speed record was set several times during racing, with the final record set by the French team at 99.94 km/h. Mark roundings were high stakes maneuvers, with most teams intentionally "landing" the boats to scrub speed.  There were two near-capsizes from Canada and Denmark, and Australia sustained damage at the end of race one during a sudden de-foil, but the fleet managed the conditions well for three exciting races.

Day 2's wind was at the minimum 10 km/h range so the fleet's modular wings were extended from Day 1's 18 meters to the tallest 29 meter configuration. Although two races were attempted, both courses were shortened and only one was completed within the 14 minute time limit.  The event final then featured light air tactics from USA, NZL and GRB hunting for patches of wind to speed them across the finish.

Two teams were penalized points for boat to boat contact: Switzerland was docked 4 event points and 2 championship points for contact with USA during practice.  USA was docked 8 event points and 4 championship points for contact with France during race 5.

Round 6: Cádiz 
Race management has increased the time limit for races from 14 minutes to 16 minutes, and decreased the minimum legs from 4 to 3.

Round 7: Dubai

Round 8: Singapore

Round 9: Sydney

Round 10: New Zealand

Results 
Points are awarded per race for the Event Leaderboard, with 10 points for the winner, 9 points for second place, 8 points for third, and so on.

Each event hosts multiple races, with the three highest scoring teams of the event facing off in an additional final race to decide the podium order. The winner of that final wins the event, with the final standings of the event leaderboard used to award points for the Championship Leaderboard. The winner is awarded 10 Championship points, second awarded 9, and so on.

The three highest scoring teams at the end of the season compete in the Sail GP Grand Final with the winning team awarded the championship.

Impact League 
As part of SailGP's sustainability initiatives, the championship runs a second leaderboard on which teams compete to have the greatest improvement in the sustainability of the sport. Teams are externally audited after each round against 10 criteria, with the top three ranked teams awarded prize money to be donated to the teams' sustainability partners.

Standings

Notes

References

External links 

 SailGP website

Season 3
SailGP
SailGP
SailGP